Francis P. McDermott (born March 9, 1895) was an American college football player and coach. He served as the head football coach at Duquesne University in Pittsburgh, Pennsylvania from 1925 to 1926, compiling a record of 2–12–1.

Head coaching record

College

References

1895 births
Year of death missing
American football ends
Bucknell Bison football players
Duquesne Dukes athletic directors
Duquesne Dukes football coaches
High school football coaches in Pennsylvania
People from Clearfield County, Pennsylvania
Coaches of American football from Pennsylvania
Players of American football from Pennsylvania